The A. C. Smith & Co. Gas Station is a historic gas station at 117 Beale Street in Quincy, Massachusetts.  It is a single-story brick, with a front facade divided into three vehicle bays on the left and an office on the right, with a pedestrian entrance to the work area in between.  A low-pitch gable at the center acts a kind of parapet, and there are round decorative panels on the front facade.  The building was constructed in 1926, and is a little-altered example of an early functional automotive filling and service station.  Its original brickwork remains in good condition, and its service bays are distinctively illuminated in part by original skylights.

The building was listed on the National Register of Historic Places in 1994.

See also
National Register of Historic Places listings in Quincy, Massachusetts

References

Commercial buildings completed in 1926
Transport infrastructure completed in 1926
Buildings and structures in Quincy, Massachusetts
Retail buildings in Massachusetts
National Register of Historic Places in Quincy, Massachusetts
Gas stations on the National Register of Historic Places in Massachusetts
Transportation buildings and structures in Norfolk County, Massachusetts
1926 establishments in Massachusetts